Mantra of Love is an album by Acid Mothers Temple & The Melting Paraiso U.F.O., released in 2004 by Alien8 Recordings.

Track listing

Credits 

Credits, as stated on the Acid Mothers website:

 Cotton Casino – vocal, beer cigarettes
 Tsuyama Atsushi – monstar bass, vocal, cosmic joker
 Higashi Hiroshi – synthesizer, dancin'king
 Koizumi Hajime – drums, percussion, sleeping monk
 Kawabata Makoto – guitar, bouzouki, electric sitar, violin, hammond organ, speed guru

References 

2004 albums
Acid Mothers Temple albums
Alien8 Recordings albums